Miguel Ángel Celdrán Matute (4 March 1940 – 28 January 2021) was a Spanish politician. He was a member of the People's Party.

Biography
Prior to his political career, Celdrán directed a driving school and served as a technical engineer for the Spanish government.

In the early 1980s, he joined the Liberal Party, led by Joaquín Garrigues Walker, which had merged with the Union of the Democratic Centre. In 1990, he joined the People's Party and was elected to the Municipal Council of Badajoz the following year. He was elected as mayor of the commune on 26 May 1995 and was reelected in 1999, 2003, and 2007. He was then elected to the Senate of Spain to represent Badajoz, but resigned after only eight months. He regained his seat on 14 March 2004, but did not stand in the subsequent elections. On 27 May 2007, he was elected to the Assembly of Extremadura, representing the Province of Badajoz. Additionally, he served as a member of the Spanish Federation of Municipalities and Provinces.

Miguel Celdrán died in Badajoz on 28 January 2021 at the age of 80.

References

1940 births
2021 deaths
Mayors of places in Extremadura
Members of the Senate of Spain
Members of the 7th Assembly of Extremadura
Democratic and Social Centre (Spain) politicians
People's Party (Spain) politicians
People from Badajoz